This page lists Fawlty Towers cast members. The names of the regular cast members link to the pages for the actor and for the Fawlty Towers character.

 Trevor Adams as Alan in "The Wedding Party"
 Denyse Alexander as Kitty in "The Anniversary"
 Lewis Alexander as Chris (3rd hotel inspector) in "The Hotel Inspectors"
 James Appleby as Mr. Stubbs in "The Builders"
 Robert Arnold as Arthur in "The Anniversary"
 Elizabeth Benson is Mrs. Heath in "Gourmet Night" and Mrs White in "The Kipper and the Corpse"
 Lisa Bergmayr as German Guest in "The Germans"
 Ballard Berkeley is Major Gowen (regular)
 Imogen Bickford-Smith as Girlfriend in "The Psychiatrist"
 Norman Bird as Mr. Arrad in "Waldorf Salad"
 Bruce Boa as Mr. Hamilton in "Waldorf Salad"
 Connie Booth is Polly Sherman (regular)
 Willy Bowman as German Guest in "The Germans"
 Bill Bradley as Mr. Mackintosh in "Communication Problems"
 Peter Brett as Brian (1st hotel inspector) in "The Hotel Inspectors"
 Pamela Buchner as Miss Young in "The Kipper and the Corpse"
 Richard Caldicot as Lionel Twitchen in "Gourmet Night"
 Ken Campbell as Roger in "The Anniversary"
 John Cleese is Basil Fawlty (regular)
 Terence Conoley is Mr. Wareing in "A Touch of Class" and Mr Johnstone in "Waldorf Salad"
 James Cossins as Mr. Walt in "The Hotel Inspectors"
 Brenda Cowling as Sister in "The Germans"
 Bernard Cribbins as Mr. Hutchinson in "The Hotel Inspectors"
 Michael Cronin as Mr. Lurphy in "The Builders"
 Allan Cuthbertson as Colonel Hall in "Gourmet Night"
 Claire Davenport as Miss Wilson / Large woman in "The Germans"
 Richard Davies as Mr. White in "The Kipper and the Corpse"
 Anthony Dawes as Mr. Libson in "Waldorf Salad"
 Aimée Delamain as Mrs. Johnson in "The Psychiatrist"
 Barney Dorman as Mr. Kerr in "The Builders"
 June Ellis as Mrs. Johnston in "Waldorf Salad"
 Robin Ellis as Danny Brown in "A Touch of Class"
 Gilly Flower is Miss Abitha Tibbs (regular)
 Sabina Franklyn as Quentina in "Basil the Rat"
 Dorothy Frere as Miss Hare in "Waldorf Salad"
 Iris Fry as Mrs. Sharp in "The Germans"
 Yvonne Gilan as Mrs. Peignoir in "The Wedding Party"
 Dan Gillian as German Guest in "The Germans"
 Elspet Gray as Dr. Abbott in "The Psychiatrist"
 Michael Gwynn as Lord Melbury in "A Touch of Class"
 Brian Hall is Terry the Chef (regular, second series)
 Michael Halsey as Mr. Jones in "The Builders"
 Basil Henson as Dr. Abbott in "The Psychiatrist"
 Nicky Henson as Mr. Johnson in "The Psychiatrist"
 Roger Hume as Reg in "The Anniversary"
 Betty Huntley-Wright as Mrs. Twitchen in "Gourmet Night"
 Nick Kane as German Guest in "The Germans"
 Pat Keen as Virginia in "The Anniversary"
 David Kelly as Mr. O’Reilly in "The Builders"
 Diana King as Mrs. Lloyd in "The Wedding Party"
 Melody Lang as Mrs. Taylor in "Basil the Rat"
 Robert Lankesheer as Mr. Thurston in "Communication Problems"
 John Lawrence as Mr. Sharp in "The Germans"
 George Lee is a Delivery Man twice: (Bennion) in "The Builders" and Kerr in "Communication Problems"
 Louis Mahoney as Doctor Finn in "The Germans"
 André Maranne as André in "Gourmet Night"
 Len Marten as a Guest in "The Kipper and the Corpse"
 Raymond Mason as Mr. Zebedee in "The Kipper and the Corpse"
 Robert McBain as Mr. Xerxes in "The Kipper and the Corpse"
 Charles McKeown as Mr. Ingrams in "The Kipper and the Corpse"
 Geoffrey Morris as John (2nd hotel inspector) in "The Hotel Inspectors"
 Jay Neill as Bar Guest (Customer) in "The Wedding Party"
 David Neville as Ronald in "Basil the Rat"
 Claire Nielson as Mrs. Hamilton in "Waldorf Salad"
 Tony Page as Ronald Heath in "Gourmet Night"
 Geoffrey Palmer as Dr. Price in "The Kipper and the Corpse"
 Mervyn Pascoe as Mr. Yardley in "Communication Problems"
 Luan Peters as Raylene Miles in "The Psychiatrist"
 Conrad Phillips Mr. Lloyd in "The Wedding Party"
 Steve Plytas as Kurt the chef in "Gourmet Night"
 Mavis Pugh as Mrs. Chase in "The Kipper and the Corpse"
 John Quarmby as Mr. Carnegie in "Basil the Rat"
 Renee Roberts as Miss Ursula Gatsby (regular)
 Derek Royle as Mr. Leeman in "The Kipper and the Corpse"
 Andrew Sachs is Manuel (regular)
 Joan Sanderson as Mrs. Alice Richards in "Communication Problems"
 Prunella Scales is Sybil Fawlty (regular)
 Jeffrey Segal as Mr. Heath in "Gourmet Night"
 Johnny Shannon as Mr. Firkins in "Communication Problems"
 Beatrice Shaw as Miss Gurke in "Waldorf Salad"
 Christine Shaw as Audrey in "The Anniversary"
 Stuart Sherwin as a Guest in "Basil the Rat"
 David Simeon as Mr Mackenzie in "A Touch of Class"
 Una Stubbs as Alice in "The Anniversary"
 Stella Tanner as Mrs. Arrad in "Waldorf Salad"
 James Taylor as Mr. Taylor in "Basil the Rat"
 April Walker as Jean Wilson in "The Wedding Party"
 Ann Way as Mrs. Hall in "Gourmet Night"
 Lionel Wheeler as Mr. Watson in "A Touch of Class"
 Martin Wyldeck as Sir Richard Morris in "A Touch of Class"

References
The Complete Fawlty Towers by John Cleese & Connie Booth (1988, Methuen, London) 

Lists of actors by British television series
Lists of actors by comedy television series